Djamel Tlemçani, (born April 16, 1955) is a former Algerian international footballer who played as a midfielder for several French and Swiss clubs. He was a member of the Algerian National Team at the 1982 FIFA World Cup.

Honours
Algerian Cup winner in 1978 with CR Belcourt

External links
 
 
 

1955 births
Living people
People from Médéa
Association football midfielders
Algerian footballers
Algerian expatriate footballers
Algeria international footballers
Olympique de Médéa players
CR Belouizdad players
Stade de Reims players
FC Rouen players
SC Toulon players
FC La Chaux-de-Fonds players
Quimper Kerfeunteun F.C. players
Stade Rennais F.C. players
FC Lorient players
Ligue 1 players
Ligue 2 players
1982 FIFA World Cup players
Expatriate footballers in France
Expatriate footballers in Switzerland
Algerian expatriate sportspeople in France
Algerian expatriate sportspeople in Switzerland
21st-century Algerian people